Maybe You Should Drive is the second studio album by Barenaked Ladies. It was released in August 1994 and went double platinum in Canada, reaching No. 3 upon its release. It was also their first album to chart in the US, peaking at No. 175 on the Billboard 200. Unlike on their previous album Gordon, Steven Page and Ed Robertson did not collaborate as frequently.

As with each of their early albums, the band recorded one song, "Intermittently", completely naked. Tracks cut from the album include "Break Your Heart" and "Trust Me", both of which were later re-recorded for Born on a Pirate Ship; the former was re-worked and appeared on that album, while the latter was cut again, and appeared as a B-side on the Shoe Box EP.

Of the recording session, Page said "We did most of the last record in Burnaby, a cold and industrial wasteland, with a huge budget we really didn't need [...] All a huge budget does is put you further in debt. Imagine if they raised your VISA limit to $5,000 and then you had to give your card to a professional shopper — let's call him a  producer in the case — and he said, 'OK, let's spend the whole thing.'"

Page added that keyboardist/percussionist Andy Creeggan considered leaving the band during album rehearsals, but was convinced to stay for its completion and subsequent promotional tour. Creeggan did indeed depart the band and entered McGill University's music program. He has since recorded four albums with his brother Jim (who is also bassist for Barenaked Ladies) under the name The Brothers Creeggan.

Track listing

Personnel
Barenaked Ladies
Andy Creeggan – piano (2, 3, 4, 5, 6, 8, 9, 10, 11), percussion (3, 5, 8), background vocals (1, 2, 4, 5, 7, 8, 10, 11), lead vocal (9), electric piano (5, 7, 12), keyboard (5, 12), cymbals (2, 6), organ (7), hammered dulcimer (1), timpani (2), accordion (6), reed organ (6), tambourine (7), cuica (9)
Jim Creeggan – electric bass (1, 2, 3, 5, 7), double bass (4, 5, 6, 8, 10, 11, 12), background vocals (1, 2, 4, 5, 7, 8, 10, 11), cello (2, 5, 11), arco bass (2)
Steven Page – lead vocal (1, 2, 4, 5, 6, 7, 10, 11), background vocals (1), acoustic guitar (1), electric guitar (2, 7), lead electric guitar (3), harmony vocal (12)
Ed Robertson – acoustic guitar (1, 3, 4, 6, 7, 8, 10, 11, 12), electric guitar (1, 2, 3, 5), background vocals (1, 2, 4, 5, 7, 10, 11), lead vocal (3, 6, 8, 12), pedal steel guitar (3, 6), bass drum (2, 6), banjo (3), mandolin (4), electric mandolin (2), mandola (12)
Tyler Stewart – drums (1, 2, 3, 4, 5, 6, 7, 10, 11, 12), snare drum (2, 6, 11), cowbell (5), laffs (5), cymbals (8)

Charts 
Album

References 

Barenaked Ladies albums
1994 albums
Reprise Records albums